This is a list of episodes for the third and final season of DreamWorks Animation's animated television series, The Penguins of Madagascar. It began airing on Nickelodeon in the United States on April 16, 2012. Premieres were moved to Nicktoons from December 24, 2013, to December 19, 2015.

Episodes

DVD releases

References 

 General references that apply to most episodes
 
 

2012 American television seasons
2013 American television seasons
2015 American television seasons